Mazzella may refer to:

People
 Camillo Mazzella (1833–1900), Italian Jesuit theologian and cardinal
 Frédéric Mazzella (born 1976), French entrepreneur
 Gian Luca Mazzella, Italian journalist, wine and food critic
 Kavisha Mazzella (born 1959), Australian multi-instrumental musician, activist and painter
 Luigi Mazzella (born 1932), Italian politician

Places
 Mazzella Field, a soccer stadium in New Rochelle, New York, USA
 Cava Mazzella, a natural cave on the island of Palmarola, Italy

Other uses
 SS Dea Mazzella (1942), the cargo ship also called SS Empire Driver